The Savoy is a historic apartment building located at Indianapolis, Indiana.  It was built in 1898, and is a six-story, three-bay-wide, buff-colored brick building on a raised basement.  It has rock faced arched entrance, oriel windows on the second through fourth floors, Romanesque Revival style arched windows on the top floor, and a projecting cornice.

It was listed on the National Register of Historic Places in 1983.

References

Apartment buildings in Indiana
Residential buildings on the National Register of Historic Places in Indiana
Romanesque Revival architecture in Indiana
Residential buildings completed in 1898
Residential buildings in Indianapolis
National Register of Historic Places in Indianapolis